The Search for Truth by Natural Light is an unfinished philosophical dialogue by René Descartes “set in the courtly culture of the ‘’ and ‘’.” It was written in French (presumably after the Meditations was completed) but first published (Amsterdam, 1684) in Dutch translation in a collection of letters from Descartes by JH Glazemaker, and then in a Latin translation in the Opuscola posthuma, physica & mathematica (Amsterdam, 1701). The original French was lost around 1700 but a partial copy was discovered in G.W. Leibniz's papers in Hanover in 1908 and published in the Adam-Tannery edition of Descartes's works and correspondence (vol. X, pp. 495-532). A definitive edition, containing the partial French text plus the fuller Dutch and Latin translations on facing pages was published in 2002. The opening passage (translated by Norman Kemp Smith to English in 1957) "is a helpful commentary on the argument of Articles 74-78" of the Meditations.

Descartes’s intent 
Descartes begins by observing that "even though all the science that we can desire is to be found in books, what they contain of good is mixed with so many uselessness, and dispersed in the mass of so many large volumes, that for it would take longer to read than human life gives us, and to recognize what is useful in it, more talent than to find it ourselves. He therefore adds: "This is what makes me hope that the reader will not be sorry to find here a more abbreviated way, and that the truths which I will put forward will be acceptable to him, although I do not borrow them from Plato or to Aristotle."

The dialogue 
Descartes then imagines a conversation between three characters: Eudoxus (Descartes's "mouthpiece"), Polyander and Epistemon. Eudoxus is a man endowed with an ordinary mind, but whose judgment is not spoiled by any false opinion, and who has all his reason intact, as he received it from nature; in his country house, where he lives, he receives a visit from two men of the greatest mind, and the most distinguished of the century, one of whom (Polyander) has never studied anything, while the other (Épistemon ) knows very well everything that can be learned in schools.

Eudoxus praises the merits of doubt: "Only pay me your attention; I will take you further than you think. Indeed, it is from this universal doubt that, as from a fixed and immutable point, I have resolved to derive the knowledge of God, of yourself, and of all that the world contains".

The cogito 
Descartes provides, in this reply by Eudoxus to Epistemon, his only statement of the cogito per se, and admits that his insight is also expressible as dubito, ergo sum:

Notes

See also 
 Cartesian doubt
 Cogito, ergo sum

References

External links 
 Proceedings of the study day, News from the Republic of Letters, 1999 – I (articles in PDF)

Works by René Descartes
Epistemology literature
1684 books